The Hunting Party Tour was the eleventh concert tour by American rock band Linkin Park. It was launched in support of Linkin Park's sixth studio album, The Hunting Party (2014). The tour was partially announced in May 2014 through a teaser released after the release of trailer of a co-headlined tour Carnivores Tour by Linkin Park and Thirty Seconds to Mars. Later, the tour was officially announced on November 23 with a whole trailer in promotion. Its first leg under the name European Tour began on May 30, 2014, in Lisboa, Portugal, and ended on June 14 in Castle Donington, England, where they played Hybrid Theory in its entirety. The tour also featured special guests Of Mice & Men and Rise Against. On January 15, 2015, the band begun the world tour for The Hunting Party with the first leg under North American Tour. During a show at Indianapolis, Chester Bennington injured his leg, which led to the cancellation of the tour North American Tour. The band continued the world tour on May 9, performing at the first edition of Rock In Rio in America. It was Linkin Park's last full album tour to feature Chester Bennington as vocalist before his death in 2017.

Background
Rumors of a tour from Linkin Park first circulated after the release of the trailer for the Carnivorous Tour. The tour's first leg was in Europe where the band played nine shows. The leg had a duration of sixteen days. The tour began with the "Rock In Rio" show in Lisboa. And later the tour took a break after the Download Festival where the band played Hybrid Theory as a whole album together for the first time. The first leg included shows like Rock in Rio, Rock am Ring, Rock im Park, Alfa Romeo City Sound, Greenfield and Download Festival.

The second leg of the tour started after the end of the Carnivores Tour, and was titled as "The Hunting Party European Tour". The duration of the second leg was twenty-two days which included sixteen shows. Of Mice & Men were included as special guest for this leg and also toured with Linkin Park in North America. The leg was the return of band from North America back to Europe. It started on November 3, at Zürich in Switzerland. The same date was also the official declaration of "The Hunting Party Tour". The show at O2 World in Berlin became the first live concert in the world to be broadcast at Astra 19.2 degrees East in Ultra HD (3840 x 2160 pixel) in HEVC standard, at 50 fps and a color depth of 10 bit. The broadcast was confirmed on November 13, by Warner Music Germany and SES. The band released a pop up store in Berlin during the tour, and it was sponsored by Samsung.

The third leg of the tour was officially announced on November 3, 2014, after the completion of Carnivores Tour. The trailer revealed that the tour would feature guest artists like Of Mice & Men and Rise Against'. The second leg was supposed to have nineteen shows but only three shows took place, after the cancellation of the rest shows, due to the leg injury of Chester Bennington. Later on another additional leg was introduced as North American Summer Tour in support of the album. Whereas Of Mice and Men and Rise Against were not included in the line up.

The concert tour kept going by continuing the second leg of European tour. The leg is scheduled to take place after the Stone Temple Pilots with Chester Bennington's Spring U.S. Tour and seven headlining concerts by the band like Rock in Rio USA where the band will play with artists like Deftones, John Legend, No Doubt, Metallica, and Taylor Swift, Rock on the Range, Rocklahoma, Amnesia Rockfest, Loudwire Music Festival and Summerfest. This leg will feature Lower Than Atlantis as special guests for the Berlin show. The shows included Rock in Roma and the FM4 Frequency Festival.

A new leg was introduced during early May, which included five shows in China. The leg was named as "The Hunting Party China Tour". The leg was powered by Life and presented by Mercedes Benz. All the shows during the leg will take place at stadiums across China. Only eight hours after the announcement, the box office for the five concerts broke past 24 million yuan ($3.8 million). Also, since the announcement, tickets for the concert have almost sold out.

Development
Sales for general tickets began on November 7, 2014. Linkin Park offered pre-sale tickets for the fan club members. The set list mixed The Hunting Party with the rest of the band's catalog.
A minute-long trailer for the tour premiered in November 2014, featuring a British narrator and assorted live scenes, paired with some of the bands' songs, including "Bleed It Out", "In The End", "Guilty All the Same", "Final Masquerade", "What I've Done" and "Rebellion" by Linkin Park and "I Don't Want to Be Here Anymore", "Tragedy + Time" by Rise Against. The promotional poster for the tour featured the hashtag as "#THEHUNTINGPARTYTOUR". The volunteering during the tour was done by "Music for Relief" The Chinese leg of the tour was powered by "Life" and presented by "Mercedes Benz". The presale of the tickets started on May 6. The tickets were provided by "Yongle Ticket" and "228".

Opening Acts

Animal Jazz 
Fall Out Boy 
Of Mice & Men 
Rise Against 
Mad Caddies 
Nothing More 
A Day to Remember 
While She Sleeps 
The Last Internationale 
My Riot 
Disco Ensemble 
Dead by April 
Lower Than Atlantis 
Broiler 
Kraftklub 
Simple Plan

Gross
Though the band had only three shows in North America after the cancellation of the remaining dates, the gross compiled by the tour was $1,022,937 making the band the third largest gross collector of January. The shows between November 22–24, made Linkin Park again the third largest gross collector with $3,154,280 collected. The tour had only five shows in China, but as the shows were announced, the box office broke past 24 million yuan ($3.8 million).

Set list
These set list are representative of the shows in Frankfurt, Germany, at Festhalle, in Rybnik, Poland, at Rybnik Stadium, and in Las Vegas, Nevada, during the first edition of Rock in Rio USA. It does not represent all dates throughout the tour.

Tour dates

Notes

Notes

References

External links

2014 concert tours
2015 concert tours
Linkin Park concert tours